Janet Ruth Montgomery (born 29 October 1985) is an English film and TV actress. She first gained attention for her role as Ames in the second season of the television series Human Target (2010–11), and also for her appearance in the 2009 straight-to-DVD film The Hills Run Red. She played the lead character in the television drama Made in Jersey (2012), cancelled after eight episodes. From 2014 to 2017, she starred as the lead character, Mary Sibley, in the series Salem. Montgomery has played the role of Lauren Bloom on the television series New Amsterdam since 2018.

Career
Although trained as a dancer at the Stella Mann College of Performing Arts, Bedford, Montgomery chose to pursue acting rather than dance professionally. Her lack of drama school training made it difficult for her to obtain acting representation initially. She achieved her breakthrough after producing a play with her friend Gethin Anthony.

In 2008, Montgomery was cast as the love interest of the character Tony Stonem in an episode of the teenage drama Skins. She also appeared in both the TV movie Dis/Connected and the short film Flushed.

The following year, Montgomery appeared in two straight-to-DVD horror-genre releases filmed in Sofia, Bulgaria – The Hills Run Red and the finale of the original Wrong Turn trilogy, Wrong Turn 3: Left for Dead and played the role of Fallyn Werner, a teenage killer in the Lifetime film Accused at 17.

In 2010, Montgomery appeared in her first theatrically released film, playing Giselle in the independent horror film Dead Cert and the supporting role of Madeline in the Academy Award-nominated psychological thriller Black Swan – playing a Little Swan to Natalie Portman's Oscar-winning portrayal of the Black Swan.

That same year Montgomery also signed on to play Paul Rudd's love interest in Our Idiot Brother. After seeing her audition tape in Los Angeles, producers worked around her schedule on Entourage and flew her to New York to begin shooting. While working on Entourage, Montgomery was invited to appear on The League, a critically acclaimed semi-improvised show about American football, and played Ambrosia the stripper in the first episode of the second season.

In December 2011, Montgomery starred as Princess Mithian, a love interest of King Arthur, in Series 4 Episode 11 of Merlin, later returning in Series 5 Episode 4 (alongside James Fox).

In 2012, Montgomery played the lead role in the CBS television series Made in Jersey. The series was cancelled after two episodes aired. Two new episodes aired on 22 December 2012.

Montgomery attracted the attention of Stephen Poliakoff via an audition tape she sent to casting director Andy Pryor for the role of Sarah in Dancing on the Edge. The five-part miniseries aired 4 February 2013 on BBC Two.

She also played opposite David Tennant in BBC Four's Spies of Warsaw. She played Grace Van Helsing, "the prodigal daughter who returns to run the family newspaper (and presumably stake a few vampires)" in the unsold ABC pilot Gothica. Actor Chris Egan played her love interest, the character Dorian Gray.

From 2014 to 2017, Montgomery played the lead role of powerful witch Mary Sibley on the WGN America gothic horror series Salem. In October 2016, Montgomery started in a recurring role on the NBC drama This Is Us. Also in 2016, Montgomery was cast in the lead female role in the comedy film Amateur Night alongside Jason Biggs.

In February 2018, Montgomery was cast in a main role in the NBC medical drama New Amsterdam, as Lauren Bloom, the head ER physician. In October 2019, she played the role of Marguerite in the American drama thriller film Nighthawks.

Personal life
Montgomery was born in Bournemouth, England. Her uncle was bass player Mike "Monty" Montgomery of Zoot Money's Big Roll Band. She has a younger brother, Jason, who is also an actor. It was announced in November 2018 that Montgomery was expecting her first child with boyfriend Joe Fox, a daughter, who was born in 2019. The couple married in Jamaica on 29 November 2019.

Filmography

Film

Television

Awards and nominations

References

External links

 

1985 births
Actresses from Los Angeles
English child actresses
English film actresses
English television actresses
English expatriates in the United States
Living people
Actors from Bournemouth
Alumni of the Stella Mann College of Performing Arts
English female dancers
Actresses from Dorset
21st-century English actresses
21st-century American actresses